Maków may refer to:

Maków, Lesser Poland Voivodeship, south Poland
Maków, Łódź Voivodeship, central Poland
Maków, Masovian Voivodeship, east-central Poland
Maków, Silesian Voivodeship, south Poland
Maków, Warmian-Masurian Voivodeship, north Poland
Maków County, a county in Masovian Voivodeship, east-central Poland
Maków Mazowiecki, a town in Masovian Voivodeship, east-central Poland

See also 
Maków-Kolonia, Łódź Voivodeship, central Poland
Makov (disambiguation)
Makowo (disambiguation)